is a 1945 Japanese period drama film written and directed by Akira Kurosawa, based on the kabuki play Kanjinchō, which is in turn based on the Noh play Ataka. It depicts a famous 12th century incident in which Yoshitsune and a small group of samurai cross into enemy territory disguised as monks.

The film was initially banned by the occupying Supreme Commander of the Allied Powers (SCAP), likely due to its portrayal of feudal values. Kurosawa blamed bureaucratic sabotage by the wartime Japanese censors, who also disapproved. It was later released in 1952 following the signing of the Treaty of San Francisco.

Plot
In 1185, the Heike clan fights against the Minamoto clan. After a bloody naval battle in the Seto Inland Sea, Yoshitsune Minamoto defeats the enemy and the survivors commit suicide. When the triumphant Yoshitsune arrives in Kyoto, his brother, the Shogun Yoritomo, is uneasy and orders his men to arrest Yoshitsune. However, Yoshitsune escapes with six loyal samurai led by Benkei and they head to the country of his only friend Hidehira Fujiwara. Near the border, after crossing the forest disguised as monks, their porter discovers that they are Yoshitsune and the six samurai and advises that the fearful Kajiwara and his soldiers are waiting for them at the border to arrest them. Yoshitsune disguises as a porter and at the barrier, Benkei has to convince Kajiwara that they are six monks traveling to collect donations to repair the Todai temple in Nara.

Cast
 Denjirō Ōkōchi as Benkei
 Tadayoshi Nishina as Yoshitsune 
 Susumu Fujita as Togashi
 Masayuki Mori as Kamei
 Takashi Shimura as Kataoka
 Ken'ichi Enomoto as porter
 Akitake Kōno as Ise
 Yoshio Kosugi as Suruga
 Dekao Yokoo as Hitachibo
 Yasuo Hisamatsu as Kajiwara's messenger
 Shōji Kiyokawa as Togashi's messenger

Production

According to Stephen Prince, Akira Kurosawa was in preproduction on a film about the Battle of Nagashino and Oda Nobunaga's use of firearms to defeat an enemy clan mounted on horseback with swords and spears, but his vision surpassed his resources. In the last years of World War II, Japan was suffering from extreme privation and Toho had to make do with severely restricted means, such as spotty electricity often leaving them unable to light their sets. So Kurosawa switched to a new film, writing the script for The Men Who Tread on the Tiger's Tail in a single night and promising the studio he would need only one set to make it.

Prince writes that Kurosawa subverts the famous twelfth-century incident that the film adapts by depicting Benkei in full Noh-style costume and "furnishing the seriousness and reverence that everyone expects from the story" with Noh flute and drum music through­out. The director also radically adds a new character in the porter played by comedian Ken'ichi Enomoto, whose "jabbering undercuts the pomposity of the feudal rituals". According to Prince, Japanese censors found it rude that Kurosawa was making fun of a sacred historical incident and, perhaps because of this, they did not give their file on the film to the censors of the Supreme Commander of the Allied Powers.

Release
Japanese censors failed to give a file on the film to the censors of the Supreme Commander of the Allied Powers, thus 1945's The Men Who Tread on the Tiger's Tail was banned as an "illegal, unreported" production. It was not released in Japan until 1952.

The Criterion Collection has released The Men Who Tread on the Tiger's Tail on DVD in North America as part of two 2009 Kurosawa-centered box sets; The First Films of Akira Kurosawa, the 23rd entry in their Eclipse series, and AK 100: 25 Films by Akira Kurosawa.

Analysis
Critic David Conrad has said that the character of the porter, who does not exist in the original Noh or kabuki plays, prefigures Kurosawa's later commoner characters like the woodcutter in Rashomon and the villagers in Seven Samurai. "The presence of a low-class character among the high and mighty helps anchor the story in familiar ground, and the porter is free to express thoughts that proper samurai leave unsaid... Each of Kurosawa's later jidaigeki, and many of his gendaigeki as well, would use characters of different castes and classes to achieve something similar to this dynamic. His stories play out in three-dimensional social worlds, allowing him to explore events and themes from multiple perspectives."

Notes

References

Sources

External links

 
 
 The Men Who Tread on the Tiger's Tail  at the Japanese Movie Database

1945 films
Films directed by Akira Kurosawa
Jidaigeki films
Samurai films
Films set in the 12th century
1950s Japanese-language films
Japanese black-and-white films
Toho films
Japanese films based on plays
Films with screenplays by Akira Kurosawa
Japanese drama films
1945 drama films
Films set in Ishikawa Prefecture
Cultural depictions of Minamoto no Yoshitsune
1950s Japanese films
Censored films